Heteroleibleinia is a genus of algae belonging to the family Pseudanabaenaceae.

The genus has almost cosmopolitan distribution.

Species:

Heteroleibleinia epiphytica 
Heteroleibleinia erecta 
Heteroleibleinia gardneri 
Heteroleibleinia infixa 
Heteroleibleinia kuetzingii 
Heteroleibleinia kützingii 
Heteroleibleinia leptonema 
Heteroleibleinia rigidula

References

Synechococcales
Cyanobacteria genera